Travis C. Reece (born April 3, 1975) is a former American football running back. He played for the Detroit Lions from 1998 to 1999.

References

1975 births
Living people
American football running backs
Michigan State Spartans football players
Detroit Lions players